Arsuri may refer to several villages in Romania:

 Arsuri, a village in Cornereva Commune, Caraş-Severin County
 Arsuri, a village in Schela, Gorj
 Arsuri River, a tributary of the Tișița Mică River in Romania

See also 
 Arșița (disambiguation)